Algernon William Collings (4 September 1853 — 14 May 1945) was an English cricketer who played for Gloucestershire.

He was born in Sarratt in Hertfordshire and died at his home in Burghfield Common in Berkshire.

Collings made a single first-class appearance, during the 1874 season, against Yorkshire. Batting in the tailend, he scored a single run in the only innings in which he batted, as his team won the match by an innings margin.

External links
Algernon Collings at Cricket Archive 

1853 births
1945 deaths
English cricketers
Gloucestershire cricketers
People from Three Rivers District
People from Burghfield